Electoral fusion is an arrangement where two or more political parties on a ballot list the same candidate, pooling the votes for that candidate. It is distinct from the process of electoral alliances in that the political parties remain separately listed on the ballot. The practice of electoral fusion in jurisdictions where it exists allows minor parties to influence election results and policy by offering to endorse or nominate a major party's candidate.

Electoral fusion is also known as fusion voting, cross endorsement, multiple party nomination, multi-party nomination, plural nomination, and ballot freedom.

Argentina 

Electoral fusion is currently used only in provincial elections in Corrientes, Formosa, Jujuy, La Rioja, Neuquén, Tierra del Fuego and Tucumán Provinces.

In the past it was used in Buenos Aires, Chaco, Chubut, Córdoba, Mendoza, Río Negro, San Juan, Santiago del Estero Provinces and Buenos Aires City.

Australia 
Elections for the Australian Senate allow for joint Senate tickets, which "contains members that have been endorsed by more than one registered political party". Examples of fusion tickets include the Liberal Party and Nationals fusion ticket, and the Sex Party and HEMP Party fusion ticket in 2016.

Hong Kong
While no party law exists in Hong Kong, candidates in election may list their "political affiliation" on ballots, and there is no restriction regarding the number of political parties or organisations a candidate report to be affiliated with. For example, in the 2004 Legislative Council election Chan Kam Lam, of the Democratic Alliance for the Betterment of Hong Kong, and Chan Yuen Han (unrelated), of the Hong Kong Federation of Trade Unions, running on different pro-Beijing tickets in the same multi-member constituency, were endorsed by both parties.

Italy
Electoral fusion is provided for and regulated by the Italian electoral system for general elections, to get a majority bonus. However the parties can run as stand-alones.

That is also provided for administrative divisions, to get the majority bonus in support of the candidate who gets the relative chief office.

Netherlands
The Dutch electoral law accepts common lists. In a common list two or more political parties share a list and often have a common political programme for the election. The participating political parties are identifiable for the voters because the names of these parties are mentioned on the voting paper.

Panama
In Panama electoral fusions are very frequently in presidential elections.

Philippines
In the 2010 presidential elections, Senator Loren Legarda announced her bid for vice president and was announced as running mate of Nacionalista Party presidential candidate Senator Manny Villar.

United States
Electoral fusion was once legal and common in the United States. Before the Civil War, fusion balloting was the preferred electoral tactic of abolitionist forces, who formed a number of anti-slavery third parties such as the Liberty and Free Soil parties. These and other abolitionist third parties cross-nominated major party candidates running under the Whig label, fusing more than one party behind a single candidate. Votes for fusion candidates were tallied first by party, then added together to produce the final outcome.

After the Civil War, agrarian interest groups and the political parties they founded continued to use fusion balloting to forge a ‘‘temporary alliance between third parties and the weaker of the two major parties, usually the Democrats in the Midwest and West’’ (Argersinger, 1980, p. 288). Fusion allowed minor parties to avoid the "wasted vote" and "spoiler" dilemmas that small parties face in a non-proportional voting system.

In the 19th and early 20th century, minor parties used fusion as a way to signal that their support for a major party candidate brought a meaningful number of voters to the candidate. Argersinger (1980) argues that this helped ‘‘maintain a significant third party tradition by guaranteeing that dissenters’ votes could be more than symbolic protest’’ (p. 288). 

The People's Party (also known as the Populists) is regarded as the most successful third party of the era, and that success produced a counter-reaction from the dominant major parties, who then used state legislatures to enact bans against fusion in the late nineteenth and early 20th century. In northern and western states, fusion was largely banned by Republican-led legislatures. One Republican Minnesota state legislator was clear about what his party was trying to do: "We don't propose to allow the Democrats to make allies of the Populists, Prohibitionists, or any other party, and get up combination tickets against us.  We can whip them single-handed, but don't intend to fight all creation." In southern states, fusion was largely banned by Democrats who supported Jim Crow, in an attempt to prevent political alliances between newly-enfranchised Black voters and poor white farmers.

Most states banned fusion by the early 20th century. A few did so around the turn of the 21st century, including South Dakota in 1999, Delaware in 2011, and South Carolina in 2022. 

As of 2022, fusion as conventionally understood by historians and political scientists is fully legal in two states,  Connecticut and New York. It is partially legal in three others: California allows fusion in presidential elections only, and Pennsylvania and Maryland permit it in certain judicial elections.

In Oregon and Vermont, a system of dual-labeling exists, which allows a candidate to list multiple party endorsements on a single line, but disallows the traditional fusion system in which a minor party has its own ballot line and votes are tallied by party. In New Hampshire, fusion is legal in rare cases when primary elections are won by write-in candidates. The Libertarian Party of New Hampshire used fusion to elect four members, Calvin Warburton, Finlay Rothhaus, Andy Borsa and Don Gorman, to the New Hampshire state legislature during the early 1990s. 

In November 2022, the New Jersey Moderate Party filed suit in state court to overturn the state's 1921 ban on fusion voting.

Historical Examples of Fusion Voting 
In 1864 the Democratic Party split into two wings over the question of whether to continue the American Civil War or back down and negotiate peace with the Confederacy. The War Democrats fused with the Republicans to elect a Democratic vice president, Andrew Johnson, and re-elect a Republican president, Abraham Lincoln.

In 1872, both the newly formed Liberal Republican Party and the Democratic party nominated the Liberal Republican Horace Greeley as their candidate for President of the United States: "If [The Democratic party] was to stand any chance at all against Grant, it must avoid putting up a candidate of its own who would merely split the opposition vote. It must take Greeley."

In the Presidential election of 1896, William Jennings Bryan was nominated by both the Democratic Party and the Populist Party, albeit with different vice presidential candidates, Arthur Sewall for the Democrats and Thomas E. Watson for the Populists. This election led to the downfall of the Populist Party, especially in Southern states (such as Watson's Georgia, as well as North Carolina and Tennessee) where the Populist party had engaged in electoral fusion or other alliances with Republicans against the dominant Bourbon Democrats.

Occasionally, popular candidates for local office have succeeded in being nominated by both Republican and Democratic Parties.  In 1946, prior to the current ban on fusion in state elections being enacted in that state, Republican Governor of California Earl Warren (a future Chief Justice of the United States) managed to win the nominations of the Republican, Democratic, and Progressive Parties. Similarly, Allan Shivers won the 1952 nominations of both the Democratic and Republican parties in Texas (and had his name appear on the ballot twice, once for each party; Democrat Shivers handily defeated Republican Shivers in the general election).

In the 1936 and 1940, the American Labor Party nominated Franklin Roosevelt for president, and in 1944, the Liberal Party of New York cross-nominated Roosevelt, fusing with the ALP.  FDR won the state of New York in each election, but in 1940 and 1944 he would not have won New York without the support of votes gained via the fusion parties and their voters. 

In 1948 elections, the Liberal Party of New York endorsed and nominated Harry S. Truman, by completely ignoring the Southern delegation of the Democratic Party.

In Twin Cities Area New Party v. McKenna (1996), the United States Supreme Court ruled, on a 6–3 vote, that prohibiting electoral fusion does not violate the First Amendment of the United States Constitution.

Donald Trump appeared on the 2016 presidential ballot in California with two ballot labels by his name, as the nominee of both the Republican Party and the American Independent Party, a small far-right party.  Trump was the first fusion presidential candidate on the California ballot in at least eighty years.

Wisconsin

Milwaukee 
In Milwaukee, Wisconsin, during the heyday of the Sewer Socialists, the Republican and Democratic parties would agree not to run candidates against each other in some districts, concentrating instead on defeating the Socialists. These candidates were usually called "non-partisan", but sometimes were termed "fusion" candidates instead.

New York

Fusion has the highest profile in the state of New York and particularly New York City, where it was used as a major weapon against Tammany Hall.  Most legislative and judicial elections are won by candidates endorsed by more than two parties.

The first fusion gubernatorial election was held in New York in 1854, in which the major party Whig candidate was supported in a fusion candidacy by eleven other political parties, among them the Strong-Minded Women Party, the Anti-Rent Party and the Negro Party.

In 1936, labor leaders in New York City took advantage of fusion and founded the American Labor Party (ALP) with the immediate goal of providing a way for New Yorkers who despised the city's infamous Tammany Hall political machine to support Franklin Delano Roosevelt (FDR), without casting a vote for the Democratic Party. In its first showing at the polls, the party garnered a significant amount of the vote in New York City, but was not important with regard to Roosevelt's victory. In the 1937 election cycle the ALP built on it past performance by electing members to the city council, and by delivering so many votes to Mayor LaGuardia that the New York Times ran a front page article declaring that the ALP held the balance of power in city and state politics. The importance of the ALP was demonstrated again in 1938 when the party provided the margin of victory for the Democratic candidate for Governor, and in 1940 when the ALP did the same for President Roosevelt.  In the 1944 presidential election, fusion provided CIO unions in New York an opportunity to build and back a labor party, an uncommon occurrence in the United States. Labor leaders knew that fusion permitted them to field candidates and win elections on the American Labor Party line in local elections, and to back Democrats in statewide or national races where they did not have the capacity to field successful candidates. Given the presence of fusion in New York, the Greater New York Industrial Union Council (GNYIUC), the CIO's local labor federation in New York, formally affiliated with the party making it the political arm of the New York CIO. This relationship would continue until 1948 when the GNYIUC opted to back Henry Wallace for president, instead of using fusion to back President Truman. This led to internal conflicts within the CIO and ultimately contributed to the decision by the National CIO to revoke the charter of the GNYIUC, thereby ending its relationship with the ALP.

Today, to obtain or maintain automatic ballot access, a party's candidate for governor of New York in midterm years or President of the United States in presidential years must receive either 130,000 votes or 2% of votes cast (whichever is greater) on that party's line. The party need not run its own candidate and may cross-nominate another party's candidate, but to qualify for automatic ballot access it must receive the sufficient votes on its own line. Gubernatorial vote also determines ballot order, with Row "A" going to the party whose line gains the most votes (regardless of whether or not their candidate actually wins – see the 1994 election for an example). Before 2020, parties only needed to receive 50,000 votes for governor to be qualified for automatic ballot access

Automatic ballot access means that no petitions need be filed to gain access to a ballot line for statewide and special elections, and parties may designate candidates through their own conventions. (Legislative candidates must petition onto the ballot regardless of party designation.) For local (non-statewide) office, the number of signatures required to place a candidate on the ballot is much lower for qualified parties, and they are the only parties eligible to hold primary elections. Automatic ballot access is valid for two years, and parties must gain 130,000 votes or 2% of the vote in the next gubernatorial or presidential election to again qualify for automatic ballot access.

Small parties are significant in large part for their fused ballot lines, include the Independence Party of New York, the Working Families Party, and the Conservative Party of New York State.  The Independence Party ran its own candidate for governor until 2002, but since then has instead retained its automatic ballot status by running a gubernatorial candidate who was designated by one of the major parties (to date, the party has always cross-endorsed the Democrat in gubernatorial races; it cross-endorses Republicans in lower races, particularly in the New York State Senate, whose Republican conference has strong ties to the party).  Previously influential were the Liberal Party of New York and the New York State Right to Life Party, which lost automatic ballot access in 2002.

Other parties, such as the Libertarian Party of New York, the Green Party of New York, and others, now seek ballot access by, first, getting a gubernatorial candidate on the ballot via petition (by collecting 45,000 valid signatures of registered voters), and then by getting 130,000 votes for that candidate on their line. As a general rule, neither party uses electoral fusion, and both rely on their own candidates. The Green Party, which had first achieved ballot status in 1998, failed to gain 50,000 votes (then the requirement) and also lost its ballot status in 2002, but regained its line when the 2010 election results were certified. In 2018, Larry Sharpe, the Libertarian Party candidate for governor, received over 90,000 votes, giving the party ballot status for the first time in its history.

The Liberal Party, which had been active since 1944, became defunct as a result of the 2002 gubernatorial election. Andrew Cuomo got the Liberal Party nomination and ran in the Democratic primary against Carl McCall, who had secured the Working Families nomination.  Cuomo subsequently dropped out and endorsed McCall, but his name remained on the Liberal party line and failed to gain 50,000 votes, leading to the Liberal Party's failure to retain status and losing its automatic ballot line.  A Federal lawsuit (joined by Green, Libertarian, and other parties) enjoined the Board of Elections from discarding enrollment records of these disqualified parties, and also required modifications to allow voters to register themselves in non-ballot parties.

In July 2019, the New York Legislature passed a budget bill that included the creation of a Public Campaign Financing Commission, which was given authority to investigate and create rules for public financing of campaigns. The Conservative Party of New York and the Working Families Party each filed lawsuits against the state in response, alleging that the commission was a disguised attempt to end fusion voting and thus the existence of New York's third parties.

Oregon
Prior to 1958, Oregon practiced a form of fusion that required the state to list multiple nominating parties on the candidate's ballot line. Sylvester Pennoyer was elected governor in 1886 and 1890 as a candidate of the Democratic and People's Parties.  In 1906, seven members of the Oregon House were also elected as candidates of the People's Party and either the Democratic or Republican parties.  In 2008, a lawsuit was brought by the Independent Party of Oregon against the Oregon Secretary of State claiming that modifications to the ballot design statute in 1995 once again required the state to list multiple nominating parties on the candidate's ballot line.  The lawsuit gave rise to legislation to allow candidates to list up to three party labels after their name.  This bill passed both houses of the Oregon legislature during the 2009 legislative session. Governor Ted Kulongoski signed the bill into law on 23 July 2009.

See also

 Tactical voting
 Cross-filing
 Apparentment

Articles

References

External links
 The Power of Fusion Politics
 History of Fusion Politics in 1890s North Carolina
 National Open Ballot Project, an effort to promote fusion voting in the U.S.A.
 Independent Party Sues to get Correct Ballot Labels In Oregon
 Cross-Endorsement by Political Parties

Electoral systems
Election campaign terminology
Voting theory

ca:Coalició política
es:Coalición política
fr:Coalition politique
pt:Coligação eleitoral